Lepidoblepharis colombianus is a species of gecko, a lizard in the family Sphaerodactylidae. The species is endemic to Colombia.

Geographic range

Reproduction
L. colombianus is oviparous.

References

Further reading
Mechler B (1968). "Les Geckonidés de la Colombie ". Revue Suisse de Zoologie 75 (10): 305–371. (Lepidoblepharis festae colombianus, new subspecies, pp. 339-340 + Figures 13–18). (in French).
Vanzolini PE (1978). "Lepidoblepharis in Amazonia". Papéis Avulsos de Zoologia, São Paulo 31 (13): 203–211. (Lepidoblepharis colombianus, new status).

Lepidoblepharis
Reptiles described in 1968
Reptiles of Colombia
Endemic fauna of Colombia